is a Japanese comedian, actor, dramaturge, theatre director, and manga artist. Outside Japan, he is most well known for directing and acting in "" videos (e.g. ""), and for playing the Mac (opposite Jin Katagiri who plays the PC) in the "Get A Mac" advertising campaign in Japan. He is a member of the Rahmens owarai comedy duo. His manga series, Hana Usagi, ran from 1999 to 2004 in Young Magazine Uppers (published by Kodansha).

Controversy
Kobayashi was assigned the role of Director of the Tokyo Olympics Opening Ceremony; however, a 1998 comedy show recording of him making an insensitive joke about the Holocaust surfaced. In that comedy show, he said "We tried to play Holocaust with these human-shaped papers for a kids TV show, but our producer heavily scolded us." It was pointed out that Kobayashi's selection may violate the Olympic Charter, which advocates anti-discrimination. On 22 July, State Minister of Defense Yasuhide Nakayama updated his Twitter account. He posted: "I immediately contacted and talked to Simon Wiesenthal Center (SWC)." The SWC released a statement and expressed the view that Kobayashi's jokes include those for people with disabilities. On 22 July, the Tokyo Organising Committee of the Olympic and Paralympic Games (TOCOG) dismissed Kobayashi. He made an apology comment and said: "My job is to entertain people. I should not make people feel uncomfortable. I understand that my stupid choice of words at that time was wrong, and I regret it." On November 16, he announced his retirement from the entertainment industry.

See also
Apple Inc. advertising
List of Japanese comedians
Owarai

Notes

External links
 Kentaro Kobayashi  manga at Media Arts Database 

1973 births
Japanese male actors
Japanese comedians
Japanese theatre directors
Japanese theatre managers and producers
Manga artists
Dramaturges
People from Kanagawa Prefecture
Apple Inc. advertising
Living people